Stuart Hugh Loory (May 22, 1932 – January 16, 2015) was an American journalist and educator.

Early and education
Loory was born in Wilson, Pennsylvania. He grew up in Dover, New Jersey, where his parents, Harry and Eve Loory, owned a large furniture store. Along with his younger brother, Melvyn, he attended prep school at Blair Academy. In 1954, Loory graduated from Cornell University, where he was a member of the Quill and Dagger society and editor-in-chief of The Cornell Daily Sun. After three years at the Newark News, he received a Master's degree in journalism from Columbia University in 1958, and did postgraduate work in Vienna, Austria.

Journalism career

Newspapers
Starting in 1959, he worked at the New York Herald Tribune as a reporter, science writer (1961–63), a Washington correspondent (1963–64), and a Moscow-based foreign correspondent (1964–66). He worked briefly as a science writer for The New York Times in 1966, then as a White House correspondent for Los Angeles Times (1967–71), earning a place on President Nixon's "Enemies List." In January 1971, after Loory wrote about taxpayer expenses involved with Nixon's San Clemente, California and Key Biscayne, Florida vacation homes, Loory was summarily banned from the White House.

Broadcast
Loory was a fellow at Woodrow Wilson Center, 1971–72, and in 1973 executive editor for WNBC-TV news. He was the first Kiplinger Professor of Public Affairs Reporting at Ohio State University, 1973–75. He became associate and, later, managing editor of Chicago Sun-Times in 1975.

In 1980, he joined the staff of Turner Broadcasting Systems' Cable News Network (as managing editor of  the Washington bureau, 1980–82; Moscow bureau chief, 1983–86; senior correspondent, 1986; executive producer, 1987–90; editor-in-chief of CNN World Report, 1990–91; vice-president of CNN, 1990–95; executive vice-president, Turner International Broadcasting, Russia, 1993–97).

Academia
Since 1997, has been the first Lee Hills Chair in Free-Press Studies at the University of Missouri in Columbia, Missouri. He was editor of Global Journalist, a quarterly magazine of interest to journalists in 127 countries and moderator of Global Journalist on KBIA-FM radio, a National Public Radio affiliate in Columbia, Missouri.  Loory retired from MU in the summer of 2010.

Books

The Secret Search for Peace in Vietnam (1968, with David Kraslow)
Defeated: Inside America's Military Machine (1973)
Seven Days That Shook the World: The Collapse of Soviet Communism (1991, with Ann Isme)

Family
Loory married Marjorie Dretel of Morristown, New Jersey in 1955. They had three children: Joshua, Adam, and Miriam. Marjorie and Stuart divorced in the early 1990s. In the mid 90s Stuart met Nina Kudriavtseva, while hosting Ted Turner and Jane Fonda in the Czar's Box of the Bolshoi Theater. They were married in 1995 and now live in Brooklyn, NY. Nina travels back to Moscow many times a year to visit her family there (from a previous marriage), and to be the artistic director of Benois De La Danse, the international ballet awards. Stuart has 2 grandchildren from his first son Joshua and his wife Fern Hoppenstand: Matthew Loory and Ilana. From his daughter Miriam married to Daniel Krombach, he has: Leah, Joseph, Benjamin, and Jonathan. From his second marriage, he has two grandchildren: Kostya (Konstantin) and Areseniy (Arsen). Both of his Russian half grandchildren come from two marriages of his stepson, Lyoka (Leonid).

He died of lung cancer in Brooklyn, New York on January 16, 2015.

See also

 Afghanistanism

References

External links
Stuart Loory page via University of Missouri
Stuart H. Loory biography via Reporting Civil Rights

 The Stuart H. Loory papers at the American Heritage Center

1932 births
2015 deaths
American male journalists
Blair Academy alumni
Cornell University alumni
Ohio State University faculty
University of Missouri faculty
Deaths from lung cancer in New York (state)
Educators from Pennsylvania
People from Dover, New Jersey
People from Northampton County, Pennsylvania
Columbia University Graduate School of Journalism alumni
The New York Times writers
New York Herald Tribune people
Los Angeles Times people
CNN executives
Chicago Sun-Times people
20th-century American non-fiction writers
Writers from New Jersey
Writers from Brooklyn
Writers from Pennsylvania
American military writers
American political writers
Journalists from Pennsylvania
20th-century American male writers